Larry Kent (15 September 1900 – 7 November 1967) was an American film actor and producer.

Career
Between 1925 and 1964 Kent acted in 52 films and a handful of TV shows including Rawhide.  He had a successful career as a lead and supporting actor in the silent era but failed to make the transition to sound films and was cast largely in bit parts until his retirement in 1964.  His last film role was an uncredited part in the Elvis film Viva Las Vegas.  His most notable roles were in John Ford's Hangman's House (1928), Seas Beneath (1931) and opposite Jean Arthur in The Masked Menace (1927).  In 1933 he produced the short film Aces Wild.

Partial filmography

 Eyes Right! (1926)
 Obey the Law (1926)
 The Sea Tiger (1927)
 The Whirlwind of Youth (1927)
 Women's Wares (1927)
 The Masked Menace (1927)
 The Lovelorn (1927)
 Her Wild Oat (1927)
 Mad Hour (1928)
 The Heart of a Follies Girl (1928)
 Hangman's House (1928)
 The Head Man (1928)
 The Haunted House (1928)
 The Devil's Apple Tree (1929)
 Midstream (1929)
 Around the Corner (1930)
 Seas Beneath (1931)
 Women Won't Tell (1932)
 Man Hunt (1936)
 Times Square Playboy (1936)
 What Becomes of the Children? (1936)

References

External links

 

1900 births
1967 deaths
American male film actors
American male silent film actors
Male actors from Los Angeles
20th-century American male actors